Thomas Whitmore may refer to:
Thomas Whitmore (1599–1677), English lawyer and politician
Thomas Whitmore (1782–1846),  English Whig MP for Bridgnorth
Sir Thomas Whitmore, 1st Baronet  (1612–1653), English MP for Bridgnorth 
Thomas Charlton Whitmore (1807–1865), English Conservative politician
Sir Thomas Whitmore (died 1682), English MP for Bridgnorth
Thomas Whitmore (died 1773), English MP for Bridgnorth
Thomas Whitmore (younger) (c. 1742–1795), English MP for Bridgnorth
Thomas J. Whitmore, fictional President of the United States from the 1996 film Independence Day